Boulton is an electoral ward in the city of Derby, England.  The ward contains four listed buildings that are recorded in the National Heritage List for England.  Of these, one is listed at Grade II*, the middle of the three grades, and the others are at Grade II, the lowest grade.  The ward is a suburb of Derby to the southeast of its centre, and is largely residential.  The listed buildings consist of a church, two houses, and stables and outbuildings.


Key

Buildings

References

Citations

Sources

 

Lists of listed buildings in Derbyshire
Listed buildings in Derby